Coto de Caza (Spanish for "Hunting Reserve") is a census-designated place (CDP) and guard-gated private community in Orange County, California. The population was 14,710 at the 2020 census.

The CDP is a suburban planned community of about 4,000 homes and one of Orange County's oldest and most expensive master-planned communities. The project began in 1968, when it was envisioned as a hunting lodge, now the Lodge at Coto de Caza, and the community was completed in 2003. Coto de Caza also includes Los Ranchos Estates, a 355-acre rural community of 75 large custom homes. Los Ranchos Estates is a separate private community behind the gates of Coto de Caza and has its own homeowner's association.

The Thomas F. Riley Wilderness Park 
The Thomas F. Riley Wilderness Park, which is open to the general public, surrounds the community of Coto de Caza on its eastern, northern, and southern borders.  The park is a Wildlife and Plant Sanctuary.  Its nature center houses an educational center for outdoor education for local schools and community groups. It also serves as an ecological preserve for the native endangered plant and animal species. The park is maintained and paid for by Orange County Parks, and is administered by Park Rangers and maintenance staff.

Commerce
Residents shop in Rancho Santa Margarita, Mission Viejo, Las Flores, or Ladera Ranch.

Geography and history
Coto de Caza is located in the northern portion of Wagon Wheel Canyon in southeast Orange County, at  (33.595925, -117.587665).

The suburban planned community of Coto de Caza was a joint venture of Chevron and Arvida Corporations.  Development was first initiated in 1964.  In 1979, Arvida bought out Chevron. Richard Boultinghouse, who had previously developed McCormick Ranch in Scottsdale, Arizona, was hired as president and general manager.  In 1983, Orange County approved Coto's master plan for a community of approximately 5,000 homes, and three years later, the community officially opened. Coto de Caza's reputation as an ecologically oriented recreation community was strengthened by the former Vic Braden’s Tennis College and a 36-hole Robert Trent Jones Jr.-designed golf course.

In 1984, Arvida, Disney, Chevron, and City Federal Savings & Loan partnered in the development of Coto de Caza.  Boultinghouse was later replaced by John C Yelverton.

In 1996, Lennar took over as development manager. Under Lennar’s stewardship, Coto de Caza was repositioned to promote more luxurious homes and lower densities, coincident with the regional recovery from the recent recession. The average price of a home in Coto de Caza increased from $375,000 in 1996 to $840,000 in 2000, to well over a million dollars.

Climate
According to the Köppen Climate Classification system, Coto de Caza has a warm-summer Mediterranean climate, abbreviated "Csa" on climate maps.

Demographics

2020
The 2020 United States Census reported a population of 14,710. The racial makeup was 82.3% White, 1.7% African American, 8.4% Asian, and 11.2% Hispanic or Latino of any race.

2010
The 2010 United States Census reported that Coto de Caza had a population of 14,866. The racial makeup of Coto de Caza was 13,094 (88.1%) White (82.2% Non-Hispanic White), 132 (0.9%) African American, 26 (0.2%) Native American, 878 (5.9%) Asian, 20 (0.1%) Pacific Islander, 174 (1.2%) from other races, and 542 (3.6%) from two or more races. Hispanic or Latino of any race were 1,170 persons (7.9%).

The Census reported that 14,866 people (100% of the population) lived in households, 0 (0%) lived in non-institutionalized group quarters, and 0 (0%) were institutionalized.

There were 4,736 households, out of which 2,407 (50.8%) had children under the age of 18 living in them, 3,763 (79.5%) were opposite-sex married couples living together, 294 (6.2%) had a female householder with no husband present, 133 (2.8%) had a male householder with no wife present.  There were 96 (2.0%) unmarried opposite-sex partnerships, and 30 (0.6%) same-sex married couples or partnerships. 420 households (8.9%) were made up of individuals, and 116 (2.4%) had someone living alone who was 65 years of age or older. The average household size was 3.14.  There were 4,190 families (88.5% of all households); the average family size was 3.35.

The population was spread out, with 4,545 people (30.6%) under the age of 18, 996 people (6.7%) aged 18 to 24, 2,706 people (18.2%) aged 25 to 44, 5,452 people (36.7%) aged 45 to 64, and 1,167 people (7.9%) who were 65 years of age or older.  The median age was 42.2 years. For every 100 females, there were 96.8 males.  For every 100 females age 18 and over, there were 95.1 males.

The homeowner vacancy rate was 1.0%; the rental vacancy rate was 1.5%.  13,738 people (92.4% of the population) lived in owner-occupied housing units and 1,128 people (7.6%) lived in rental housing units.

According to the 2010 United States Census, Coto de Caza had a median household income of $169,176, with 2.0% of the population living below the federal poverty line.

2000
As of the census of 2000, there were 13,057 people, 4,049 households, and 3,644 families residing in the CDP. The population density was 1,654.5 inhabitants per square mile (639.0/km2). The racial makeup of the CDP was 89.36% White, 0.74% Black or African American, 0.15% Native American, 5.16% Asian, 0.15% Pacific Islander, 1.65% from other races, and 2.80% from two or more races. 6.65% of the population were Hispanic or Latino of any race.

There were 4,049 households, out of which 56.1% had children under the age of 18 living with them, 83.4% were married couples living together, 4.1% had a female householder with no husband present, and 10.0% were non-families. 7.5% of all households were made up of individuals, and 1.1% had someone living alone who was 65 years of age or older.  The average household size was 3.22 and the average family size was 3.40.

In the CDP, the population was spread out, with 35.1% under the age of 18, 4.0% from 18 to 24, 33.4% from 25 to 44, 23.8% from 45 to 64, and 3.7% who were 65 years of age or older.  The median age was 35 years. For every 100 females, there were 99.6 males.  For every 100 females age 18 and over, there were 97.4 males.

The median income for a household in the CDP was $136,726, and the median income for a family was $141,598. Males had a median income of $97,803 versus $50,689 for females. The per capita income for the CDP was $55,900.  About 0.7% of families and 0.9% of the population were below the poverty line, including 0.7% of those under age 18 and none of those age 65 or over.

Education
Most students in Coto de Caza reside in the Capistrano Unified School District and attend Tijeras Creek Elementary, Wagon Wheel Elementary, Las Flores Middle School, Tesoro High School, and Santa Margarita Catholic High School (located at the North Gate and not part of Capistrano Unified). St. John's Episcopal School and St. Junipero Serra Catholic School are private elementary and middle schools located outside the gates in nearby Rancho Santa Margarita.

The residents rebuffed an attempt to build a 400-student public school within the walls of the community. They had concerns that it would "undermine the privacy and security" of the enclave, that it would be "downright illegal [to place a public school on a gated private property]", that it would force admission of large numbers of non-residents to the community, and that an eventual lawsuit would force the removal of the gates. The reason for proposal was that Wagon Wheel Elementary School, which is located immediately outside the community gates, had far more students than planned. The school equipment was to consist of 20 portable buildings which would have simply been added to Wagon Wheel if the new school's construction could not be completed. Had it been built, it would have become the first public school to be built inside the limits of a gated community.

Politics and government

Coto de Caza gave more than 65 percent support to Proposition 8 in 2008.

The area is patrolled by the California Highway Patrol, Orange County Sheriff's Department, and the Coto de Caza security force.

In popular culture
For the 1984 Summer Olympics, the community served as host to the riding, running, shooting, and fencing portions of the modern pentathlon events. Princess Anne of England attended the event to support Richard Phelps, who finished fourth at the Olympic event.

The community was the original setting of the reality-based television show The Real Housewives of Orange County on Bravo, though over the years the show has expanded into other places like Newport Beach.

Notable natives and residents

Gideon Ariel (born 1939), Israeli Olympic competitor in the shot put and discus throw
Linda Blair, actress with most notable role in the movie The Exorcist
Rob Bourdon, drummer for the band Linkin Park
Rod Carew, Baseball Hall of Famer
Parker Case, guitarist for the band Say Anything and singer/guitarist for the band JamisonParker
Michael Chang, former French Open singles champion at age 17
Morris Day, musician
Jim Everett, retired Los Angeles Rams quarterback
Dave "Phoenix" Farrell, bassist for the band Linkin Park
Ryan Getzlaf, ice hockey captain for the Anaheim Ducks - Los Ranchos Estates
Paul Goydos, PGA Tour professional
Bobby Grich, retired Los Angeles Angels second baseman
Vicki Gunvalson, Original housewife of Bravo TV series
Akeem Hunt, football former running back for the Kansas City Chiefs
Jeana Keough, Original housewife of Bravo TV series
Nancy Lerner, philanthropist and billionaire - Los Ranchos Estates
William Lyon, retired major general of the United States Air Force
Booger McFarland, NFL commentator
Bode Miller, Olympic and World Championship gold medalist skier - Los Ranchos Estates
Robb Nen, former Major League Baseball right-handed relief pitcher
Teemu Selänne, retired Finnish ice hockey player "The Finnish Flash" and Stanley Cup Champion - Los Ranchos Estates
Peter Vidmar, Olympic medalist in gymnastics (2 golds, 1 silver)
Tamra Judge, RHOC, Real Housewives of Orange County
Matthew Simon, NBA analyst

See also

Canyon Lake, California

References

External links
CZ Master Association, official community website.
Los Ranchos Estates Homeowner's Association, official community website.

Venues of the 1984 Summer Olympics
Olympic modern pentathlon venues
Census-designated places in Orange County, California
Gated communities in California
Populated places established in 1968
Census-designated places in California
1968 establishments in California